Shane Fives (born 26 May 1989) is an Irish hurler who currently plays as a right corner-back for the Waterford senior team.

Born in Tourin, County Waterford, Fives developed as a hurler during his secondary schooling at Blackwater Community School in Lismore. He later attended the Waterford Institute of Technology where he won a Fitzgibbon Cup medal in 2008. 

At club level, Fives came to prominence in juvenile and underage grades with Tourin, before winning a county junior championship medal in 2009. He also played with the Carrigtwohill club in Cork from 2013 to 2015.

Fives made his debut on the inter-county scene when he was selected for the Waterford minor team in 2006. After two championship seasons with the minor team, he subsequently joined the Waterford under-21 team. By this stage Fives had also joined the Waterford senior team after being added to the panel during the 2008 championship. After a number of years he became a regular member of the starting fifteen, while also being joined by his brother Darragh, and has won one Munster medal as a non-playing substitute and one National Hurling League medal.

As a member of the Munster inter-provincial team, Fives has won one Railway Cup medal.

Honours

Waterford Institute of Technology
Fitzgibbon Cup (1): 2008

Tourin
Waterford Junior Hurling Championship (1): 2009

Waterford
Munster Senior Hurling Championship (1): 2010
National Hurling League (1): 2015

Munster
Railway Cup (1): 2016

References

1989 births
Living people
Waterford IT hurlers
Tourin hurlers
Carrigtwohill hurlers
Waterford inter-county hurlers
Munster inter-provincial hurlers
Alumni of Waterford Institute of Technology